The orange-billed nightingale-thrush (Catharus aurantiirostris) is a species of bird in the family Turdidae. It is found in Colombia, Costa Rica, El Salvador, Guatemala, Honduras, Mexico, Nicaragua, Panama, Trinidad and Tobago, and Venezuela. Its natural habitats are subtropical or tropical dry forest, subtropical or tropical moist lowland forest, subtropical or tropical moist montane forest, and heavily degraded former forest.

Northern birds have a brown back and cap, and a whitish chest and belly. Southern birds have a distinctive grey crown and darker chest and flanks.

It is fairly common within its range. It forages on the ground for insects and fruit.

The song is a less musical than other thrushes. It consists of a nasal, slurred whaaaaa.

References

Further reading

External links

 Orange-billed Nightingale-Thrush Photos from a rare U.S. sighting in the Black Hills, South Dakota in 2010
 
 
 

orange-billed nightingale-thrush
Birds of Central America
Birds of the Colombian Andes
Birds of the Sierra Nevada de Santa Marta
Birds of the Venezuelan Andes
Birds of the Venezuelan Coastal Range
Birds of Trinidad and Tobago
orange-billed nightingale-thrush
Taxonomy articles created by Polbot